A Modern Tragedy Vol. 1 is the debut EP by Canadian-American musician Grandson, released on June 15, 2018.

History

On June 5, 2018, Grandson released a music video for his single Blood // Water, along with announcing his debut EP, "A Modern Tragedy Vol. 1", to be released on June 15, 2018.

Track listing
Credits adapted from Tidal.

Release history

References

2018 debut EPs
Fueled by Ramen EPs
Grandson (musician) EPs